Griphopithecus suessi is a prehistoric species of kenyapith hominid from the Miocene of Austria and Slovakia, dated to approximately 15 million years ago. G. suessi is based on a single lower molar, with three other isolated teeth and two fragmentary pieces of postcrania referred to it. Austriacopithecus is a synonym.

G. suessi has an estimated mean body weight of 48 kg, similar to that observed in the common chimpanzee.

References

Miocene primates of Europe
Fossil taxa described in 1902
Prehistoric Germany
Prehistoric Austria
Prehistoric Slovakia
Fossils of Austria